Reginald Blore (born 18 March 1942) is a Welsh former footballer who played as a midfielder.

Reginald Blore played centre forward, played for Liverpool, moved to Southport in 1960,
then moved to Blackburn Rovers for around £5,000 in November 1963.

References

External links
 LFC History profile

1942 births
Living people
Welsh footballers
Liverpool F.C. players
Southport F.C. players
Blackburn Rovers F.C. players
Oldham Athletic A.F.C. players
Bangor City F.C. players
Ellesmere Port Town F.C. players
Association football midfielders